"Biblical" is a song by Scottish alternative rock band Biffy Clyro, released as the second single from the band's sixth studio album, Opposites (2013), on 29 March 2013.

It made number 70 on the Official UK Singles Chart.

Track listing

References

External links

Biffy Clyro songs
Song recordings produced by Garth Richardson
2013 songs
14th Floor Records singles
2013 singles
Songs written by Simon Neil